Northern Kentucky University is a public university in Highland Heights, Kentucky.  It is primarily an undergraduate institution with over 14,000 students; over 12,000 are undergraduate students and nearly 2,000 are graduate students. Northern Kentucky University is the third largest university, behind the University of Cincinnati and Miami University, of Greater Cincinnati's four large universities and the youngest of Kentucky's eight, although it joined the state system before the University of Louisville. Among the university's programs are the Salmon P. Chase College of Law and the College of Informatics, founded in 2006.

History

Early history
Northern Kentucky University began in 1948, when an extension campus for the University of Kentucky was opened in Covington, Kentucky, known as the UK Northern Extension Center. After 20 years in operation as an extension center for UK, it became an autonomous four-year college under the name Northern Kentucky State College (NKSC).  In 1970, Dr. W. Frank Steely was hired as the first president. The following year, the Salmon P. Chase College of Law, formerly an independent law school in Cincinnati, merged with Northern Kentucky State College. The main campus moved from Covington to Highland Heights, Kentucky, in 1972. NKSC awarded its first bachelor's degrees in May 1973. Rapid expansion resulted in the school being upgraded to university status in 1976.

Recent history
Since its founding in 1968 and elevation to university status in 1976, Northern Kentucky University has expanded with numerous construction projects, new colleges and a much larger, more diverse student body. One recent former president of the university, James C. Votruba, is largely credited with transforming the image of the university since his arrival in 1997, helping to build the university's reputation as a respected academic institution. As part of Votruba's administration, the university has increased its admissions standards and improved the academic performance of its students. Northern Kentucky University also launched a new university logo and branding effort in 2002. In recent years, the university has also concentrated on the construction of new and improved facilities across campus.

Presidents
 W. Frank Steely, 1970–1975
 Ralph Tesseneer, 1975–1976 (interim)
 A. D. Albright, 1976–1983
 Leon Boothe, 1983–1996
 Jack M. Moreland, 1996–1997 (interim)
 James Votruba, 1997–2012
 Geoffrey S. Mearns, 2012–2017
 Gerard St. Amand, 2017–2018 (interim)
 Ashish Vaidya, 2018–2022
 Bonita Brown, 2023– (interim)

Campus

Academic facilities
The campus was built beginning in the early 1970s, and the first building, Nunn Hall, opened in 1972. Although most of the university's students commute daily to the campus, approximately 2,000 students live on campus. In recent years, the university has been in the process of expanding its campus and facilities. The $60 million Truist Arena is a 9,400-seat arena completed in 2008. It serves as the primary venue for athletics on campus, and also as a venue for entertainment, such as live bands and concerts. The arena was originally known as The Bank of Kentucky Center, named after The Bank of Kentucky, which made an endowment of $5 million toward construction. The name was changed in 2015 when that bank was purchased by BB&T, and again in 2022 after BB&T merged with SunTrust to create Truist Financial. Additionally, a new $37 million,  Student Union building, which opened to students in August 2008, largely replaces an old university center and is designed to accommodate student needs on campus. The building includes cafeterias, stores, a game room, offices for student life programs, and other amenities for students. Other recent projects included the construction of a new parking garage to accommodate the arena and a European-style roundabout for traffic control and flow management. The most recent university master plan envisions a massive expansion of the campus by the year 2020, including multiple new academic buildings, housing developments, campus quad areas, athletic fields, parking lots and connector roads. The Landrum Academic Center houses an Anthropology Museum. The university campus is also the first educational institute in the world to have a laser-projection planetarium, as part of the Dorothy Westerman Hermann Natural Science Center. The Covington campus, located in Covington, Kentucky, closed at the end of 2008. It mainly served nontraditional and adult students and also hosted the Program for Adult-Centered Education and Emergency Medical Technology programs. Northern Kentucky University's Grant County Center, located in Williamstown, Kentucky, is a partnership between the Grant County Foundation for Higher Education and Northern Kentucky University. It houses Northern Kentucky educational programs and the Williamstown Innovation Center.

The Japanese Language School of Greater Cincinnati is a weekend supplementary Japanese school held at the Mathematics, Education and Psychology Center (MP), formerly known as the Business Education Psychology (BEP) Building. It was scheduled to move to NKU in July 1993.

Libraries
Northern Kentucky's main library is the W. Frank Steely Library, completed in 1975 and named after the first president of the university. A $9.1 million renovation and expansion project was completed in 1995. The library's five floors contain over 850,000 volumes, more than 18,000 bound periodicals, and approximately 1.4 million microforms. The two-floor Chase Law Library Northern Kentucky's other library on campus, contains more than 313,000 volumes and 57,000 monographic and serial titles.

Civic engagement
Corporate and university partnerships include The Scripps Howard Center for Civic Engagement the Fifth/Third Entrepreneurial Center the Metropolitan Education and Training Services Center, the Center for Applied Informatics, and Fidelity Investments. Other centers on campus include the Center for Applied Anthropology, the Institute for Freedom Studies, the Center for Environmental Restoration the Small Business Development Center the Institute for New Economy Technologies the Center for Environmental Education the Center for Integrative Natural Science and Mathematics and the Chase Local Government Law Center.

Academics

Northern Kentucky University academic programs are organized into seven colleges. The College of Informatics, founded in 2006, replaced the College of Professional Studies. In July 2015, the School of the Arts was created, uniting the Music, Theatre & Dance, and Visual Arts programs within the College of Arts & Sciences. In 2018, the former Honors Program became the Honors College.
 College of Arts and Sciences
 School of the Arts
 Haile College of Business
 College of Education and Human Services
 College of Informatics
 College of Health Professions
Honors College
 Salmon P. Chase College of Law

Northern Kentucky University students are also a part of individual chapters in numerous honor societies. Northern Kentucky's Alpha Beta Phi chapter of Phi Alpha Theta, the International History Honor Society, has won 18 consecutive best chapter awards.

Athletics

The university's teams for both men and women are nicknamed "Norse". Their mascot is named Victor E. Viking. Northern Kentucky University joined the Horizon League on July 1, 2015, after leaving the Atlantic Sun Conference. The 2016–17 school year was the first in which NKU is eligible for NCAA Division I championships, following the completion of its four-year reclassification period to D-I. The university fields teams in baseball, men's and women's basketball, men's and women's cross country, men's and women's golf, men's and women's soccer, softball, women's track and field, men's and women's tennis and women's volleyball.

In one of the school's first major events as a full Division I team, the Norse men's basketball team won the Horizon League, earning them a trip to the 2017 NCAA tournament.

Club sports
Students have also organized club teams in bowling, ice hockey, men soccer club, taekwondo fencing, boxing, lacrosse, rugby, kickball, skeet & trap, and Men's Wrestling. These clubs are primarily organized through the Sport Club program.

Student life

Greek life

National Panhellenic Conference
 Alpha Omicron Pi – Nu Omega
 Delta Gamma – Zeta Sigma
 Delta Zeta – Kappa Beta
 Kappa Delta – Eta Eta
 Phi Mu - Rho Nu
 Phi Sigma Sigma – Gamma Tau
 Theta Phi Alpha – Alpha Mu

North American Interfraternity Conference
 Alpha Sigma Phi - Eta Phi
 Alpha Tau Omega – Theta Omega
 Pi Kappa Alpha – Eta Rho
 Sigma Phi Epsilon – Eta RLC
 Tau Kappa Epsilon – Pi Omicron
 Theta Chi – Iota Tau

National Pan-Hellenic Council
 Alpha Kappa Alpha – Sigma Eta
 Kappa Alpha Psi – Pi Pi
 Alpha Phi Alpha – Rho Gamma

National Association of Latino Fraternal Organizations
 Alpha Psi Lambda – Psi

Government
 Student Government Association

Media
The Northerner is Northern Kentucky's student-run newspaper. It is published both in print and online. The university is also home to an independent, student-run Internet radio station Norse Code Radio Northern Kentucky University formerly hosted the award-winning public radio station, WNKU, founded in 1986, until the station's sale in August 2017.

NorseMediaTV is the PEG access Public-access television cable TV station run by Northern Kentucky University.  It airs on channel 818 on Cincinnati Bell Fioptics cable and 18 digital/96 analog on Insight Cable of Northern Kentucky.  NorseMediaTV students and faculty produce many original programs, such as "Norse Access" - a weekly talk show, various sporting events and entertainment programming. Many NorseMedia programs have won awards at the local (Blue Chips), regional (Philos) and national (Telly) levels, usually in the professional categories. Students in the program at NKU are invited to create and assist in producing the Electronic Media & Broadcasting programs for the station.

Noted people

Northern Kentucky University has over 60,000 living alumni, approximately 41,000 of them in Ohio and Kentucky. Many have gone on to achieve success in a variety of fields, including athletics, journalism, business, and government.

References

External links
 
 Northern Kentucky Athletics website

 
Public universities and colleges in Kentucky
Educational institutions established in 1968
Buildings and structures in Campbell County, Kentucky
Universities and colleges accredited by the Southern Association of Colleges and Schools
Greater Cincinnati Consortium of Colleges and Universities
Education in Campbell County, Kentucky
Tourist attractions in Campbell County, Kentucky